The Autopista A-53 is a highway in north western Spain. It links Santiago de Compostela to Ourense and follows the N-525.  It starts to the south east of Santiago at a junction with the Autopista AP-9 (72 km). It passes the Castle Pazo de Oca  and Lalín. Thereafter the road has yet to be built and in the Serra do Faro the road as the N-525 crosses a pass at 810 m, under the Pico Seco. At Ourense there are junctions with the Autovía A-52 and N-120.

References 

Transport in Galicia (Spain)
Autopistas and autovías in Spain